EURONEAR, the European Near Earth Asteroids Research, is a research project and network for the research and discovery of near-Earth objects and potentially hazardous asteroids using existing telescopes located in both hemispheres available to the members of the network. The Minor Planet Center directly credits EURONEAR with the discovery of few hundred minor planets since 2008, including 11 near-Earth asteroids.

Institutions 

Institutions which collaborate in this project are:
 :fr:Institut de mécanique céleste et de calcul des éphémérides (IMCCE), France (May 2006)
 European Southern Observatory (ESO), Chile (Sep 2006)
 Universidad Católica del Norte Instituto de Astronomía, Chile (Mar 2007)
 Isaac Newton Group of Telescopes (ING), La Palma, Spain (Jan 2008)
 Instituto de Astrofísica de Canarias (IAC), Tenerife, Spain (Apr 2009)
The dates represent the time at which the institutions joined the project.

List of named minor planets discovered with the ESO/MPG telescope in La Silla

List of near-Earth asteroids discovered with the Isaac Newton Telescope (INT) in La Palma

See also 
 Catalina Sky Survey
 Pan-STARRS
List of near-Earth object observation projects

References

External links and publications 
 The EURONEAR website
 EURONEAR Facebook page
 Near-Earth asteroids spectroscopic survey at Isaac Newton Telescope
 NEARBY Platform for Automatic Asteroids Detection and EURONEAR Surveys
 The EURONEAR Lightcurve Survey of Near Earth Asteroids
 First EURONEAR NEA discoveries from La Palma using the INT
 EURONEAR - Recovery, follow-up and discovery of NEAs and MBAs using large field 1-2 m telescopes
 EURONEAR: Data mining of asteroids and Near Earth Asteroids
 More than 160 near Earth asteroids observed in the EURONEAR network

Astronomical discoveries by institution
Near-Earth object tracking